Tom Prinsen (born 11 September 1982, in Hengelo) is a Dutch former long track speedskater who specialised in the longer distances. In 2003 he became Dutch neo junior champion. By beating Postma, Romme and Ritsma in a skateoff, he qualified himself for the World Championship of 2004 in Hamar, Norway. He ended in sixth place.

Records

Personal records

Source:

Prinsen has a score of 149.974 points on the Adelskalender

World records

Tournament overview

 NC = No classification
 DQ = Disqualified
source:

References

External links
Photos of Tom Prinsen

1982 births
Living people
Dutch male speed skaters
Sportspeople from Hengelo